is a Cutie Honey video game developed by DataWest and released by NEC for the PC-FX in Japan in 1995.

Plot 
Mysterious disappearances have been occurring throughout the South Pacific at the mysterious resort on Austral Island. Honey Kisaragi catches wind of and decides to investigate by sneaking onto the island with help from Danbei Hayami and the player character who's a private detective (an associate of Danbei's son Seiji) who comes on the request to find a family's daughter named Mizue.

The player arrives on Austral Island and befriends Miku Fujiwara. After spending some time on the island, the player finds a dark secret hidden in the shadows when Miku was being kidnapped by thugs. The player is later brought to Mizue who had been transformed into a kaijin by Panther Claw. Cutie Honey then appears after this revelation and fights the mutated Mizue off ending her life.

The player finds out from Honey that Austral Island is really a place that Panther Claw uses to create kaijin from guests of exceptional worth. With Miku among the kidnapped guests, the player teams up with Honey to rescue her and stop Panther Claw. They find out that the fortune teller Damia is actually the one who seeks out potential recruits by using her stand and a chip in her prop mask to find them and having the Panthers abduct them later. Honey fights against Damia in her kaijin form Needle Panther and defeats her.

With more investigations such as the player finding his pass card, the player and Honey eventually confront Panther Claw's leader Sister Jill. Miku is rescued before she can be converted into a kaijin while Honey fights Jill. Ultimately, Honey is victorious, ending Panther Claw's scheme. The player while unable to tell his clients any good news about Mizue, he is happy that Miku is safe.

Gameplay 
Cutie Honey FX contains elements of a visual novel, dating simulation, and point and click adventure with the player's exploration and communication between other characters being automatic with the only actions the player really does is clicking on areas, keeping up with dialogue, and picking from various choices throughout the game. Some of the characters the player encounters include Miku Fujiwara, a guest who is one of the first people that the player encounters. During battle scenes, the player assists Honey by empowering her attacks and guiding her attacks to certain areas. Failure to react in time or selecting a wrong area results in a MISS and Honey takes damage instead. At a certain part, the player even chooses what form Honey can assume.

Overview 
This is the first Cutie Honey game that was made with an original story. New forms called Fantasy Knight Honey armed with a broadsword, Wrestler Honey uses acrobatic wrestling techniques, and Commando Honey who uses a pistol are used for this game along with combat animations built for the game. The costume used for the game is based on the outfit Honey wore in the original Cutie Honey anime. The plot was later used for the light novel Cutie Honey Vol. 1.

Characters 
 Honey Kisaragi (Honey Kisaragi)/Cutie Honey
 Voice - Michiko Neya

 Hayami Danbei
 Voice - Kousei Tomita

 Miku Fujiwara
 Voice - Junko Iwao

 Mizue Ayukawa
 Voice - Yumi Takada

 Damia
 Voice - Minami Takayama

 dealer
 Voice - Shinobu Adachi

 Sarah Marsha
 Voice - Yuko Kobayashi

 Edward Turner
 Voice - Kiyoyuki Yanada

Sister Jill
 Voice - Yoko Matsuoka

 Panther Zora
 Voice - Rihoko Yoshida

 Yuko Yumemi
 Voice - Kaoru Shimamura

 Masked Man (Panther Phantom)
 Voice - Daiki Nakamura, Shinichiro Miki, Hideyuki Umezu

Staff 
 Original - Go Nagai and Dynamic Pro
 Original Story - Tatsuhiko Dan
 Supervisor - Dynamic Planning
 Producer - Naokazu Akita
 Director - Noboru Nishizawa
 Main Program - Takahiro Nozawa
 Battle Part Program - Hiroshi Yoshida
 Game Design - Kiyoshi Kato
 Scenario - Mirai Okami
 Character Design - Kenichi Onuki
 Illustration sheet - Kenichi Onuki
 Event Storyboard - Shunji Ohga
 Adventure Storyboard - Akira Nishimori
 Animation Producer - Yoshinaga Minami
 Opening Storyboard - Junji Nishimura
 Opening original picture - Shinya Takahashi
 Honey transformation original picture - Tenshi Yamamoto
 Animation director - Masami Suda
 Color designation - Mineko Maeda
 Animation Production - Bee Media
 Animation production cooperation - Tsuburaya Productions
 Music - Kenji Kojima
 Manual Design - Atsushi Kato
 Production - DataWest

Notes
Cutie Honey's Fantasy Knight Honey form resembles Lina Inverse from the Slayers franchise.

References

External links
PC-FX World - Game Overviews - Cutey Honey FX 
 Cutie Honey FX on Mainichi.jp's Gamequest game library

Cutie Honey
1995 video games
PC-FX games
Japan-exclusive video games
Video games developed in Japan
Video games featuring female protagonists